Gaspar Téllez-Girón, 5th Duke de Osuna (25 May 1625 – Madrid, 2 June 1694), 5th Marquess of Peñafiel, 9th Count of Ureña and other lesser titles, was a Spanish general and a Grandee of Spain.

He lost the Battle of Castelo Rodrigo in 1664, as part of the Portuguese Restoration War. He was Viceroy of Catalonia, 1667–1669, Governor of the Duchy of Milan, Italy, (1670–1674), when he was replaced by Claude Lamoral, Prince of Ligne.

Family ancestors background

He was the grandson of Pedro Téllez-Girón, 3rd Duke of Osuna, Viceroy of Sicily, Viceroy of Naples, and the son of Juan Tellez-Girón y Enriquez de Ribera, 4th Duke of Osuna, Viceroy of Sicily.

Don Gaspar marriages

In his first marriage in 1645 he married a cousin, Feliche de Sandoval Rojas y Enriquez de Cabrera, named as her mother Felice,  deceased in Milan, Italy on 7 October 1671, who held her own inherited title of 4th Duchess of Uceda and was therefore, also a Grandee of Spain on her own rights. She was daughter of Francisco de Sandoval Rojas, 2nd Duke of Lerma and 2nd Duke of Uceda, Duke of Cea. Her mother Felice was a member of the powerful and old Colonna family. The children who survived, (5 out of 7), were all daughters who married within the pinnacle of the highest Spanish Nobility of the time.

He married again in 1672, aged 47, 19 years old Ana Antonia Francisca, (1653–1707), 4th Marchioness of Caracena. Her father was Luis de Benavides Carrillo, Marquis of Caracena, 6th marquis of Frómista, Governor of the Duchy of Milan and Governor of the Habsburg Netherlands. Her mother was Catalina Ponce de León, third daughter of Rodrigo Ponce de León, 4th Duke of Arcos.
They had 2 sons and 2 daughters, including : 
Francisco Téllez-Girón, 6th Duke of Osuna (1678-1716), Ambassador and Plenipotentiary minister for the Treaty of Utrecht, (1713). Married in 1695, he got two daughters, so the title passed to his surviving brother:
José María Téllez-Girón, 7th Duke of Osuna (1685-1733), had issue.

References

LINDE, Luis M. Don Pedro Girón, Duque de Osuna, la hegemonía española en Europa a comienzos del siglo XVII, Ed. Encuentro, Madrid, 2005. . A study, mainly on finances and economy in European trade at the beginnings of the 17th century, through discussing the figure of Pedro Téllez-Girón y Velasco, 3rd Duke of Osuna, (1574–1624) .

Sources

1625 births
1694 deaths
Military personnel from Madrid
Gaspar
Gaspar
109
105
104
Spanish generals
Viceroys of Catalonia
Grandees of Spain